Basingstoke Town Football Club is a football club based in Basingstoke, Hampshire, England. Their motto, 'Vestigia Nulla Retrorsum', means 'Never a step backward'.

History
The club was established in 1896 by a merger of Aldworth United and Basingstoke Albion. They joined the Hampshire League in 1901, and when the league was split into geographical divisions in 1903, were placed in the North Division. They finished bottom of the division in both 1903–04 and 1904–05, and again in 1906–07 and 1907–08. However, after consecutive second-bottom finishes and then finishing fifth out of seven clubs in 1910–11, they were North Division champions in 1911–12.

Finishing as champions resulted in promotion to the County Section, although the club continued to play in the North Division. They won the North Section again in 1919–20, After league reorganisation in 1929 Basingstoke were placed in Division One. They finished as runners-up in 1965–66 and 1966–67, before winning the league in 1967–68. After finishing as runners-up again in 1968–69, they won back-to-back titles in 1969–70 and 1970–71, remaining unbeaten in the latter season.

After their third Hampshire League title, Basingstoke moved up to Division One South of the Southern League. Their first season in the Southern League saw them reach the first round of the FA Cup for the first time, eventually losing 5–1 to Northampton Town. The club remained in Division One South until 1979, when league restructuring saw them placed in the Southern Division. They won the division in 1984–85, earning promotion to the Premier Division. Two seasons later they were transferred to the Premier Division of the Isthmian League. Although they were relegated to Division One at the end of the 1987–88 season, they made an immediate return to the Premier Division after ending the following season as runners-up.

The 1989–90 season saw the club reach the first round of the FA Cup again. After beating Bromsgrove Rovers 3–0, they lost 3–2 to Torquay United in the second round. In 1993–94 they were relegated to Division One, returning to the Premier Division after finishing as Division One runners-up in 1996–97. The following season saw them reach the first round of the FA Cup and defeat Football League opposition for the first time, beating Wycombe Wanderers 5–4 on penalties after a 2–2 draw in a replay; the attendance of 5,085 was a new record for the club. They then took Northampton to a replay in the second round, before losing 4–3 on penalties. They reached the first round again in 1998–99, losing 2–1 to AFC Bournemouth.

In 2003–04 the club finished fourteenth in the Premier Division, entering a play-off against Lewes for a place in the new Conference South. Although they lost 4–1, they gained a place in the new league after Hendon decided against promotion. The club made another appearance in the FA Cup first round in 2006–07, beating League One club Chesterfield 1–0 at Saltergate before losing 3–1 to local rivals Aldershot in a second round replay. A fifth-place finish in 2011–12 saw the club qualify for the promotion play-offs. However, they lost the two-legged semi-final to Dartford 3–1 on aggregate, losing 1–0 at home and 2–1 away. They also reached the FA Cup first round again, losing 1–0 to Brentford. They qualified for the play-offs for a second time in 2014–15 after finishing third, but were beaten 2–1 on aggregate by Whitehawk in the semi-finals.

The following season saw Basingstoke make another appearance in the FA Cup first round, a 1–0 defeat at Cambridge United; however, after finishing bottom of the renamed National League South, they were relegated to the Premier Division of the Southern League. The club were placed in the Premier South division at the end of the 2017–18 season as part of the restructuring of the non-League pyramid. They went on to finish third-from-bottom of the division in 2018–19 and were relegated to Division One South. At the end of the 2020–21 season the club were transferred to the South Central Division of the Isthmian League.

The 2021/22 saw Basingstoke Town FC finish in fifth space and qualifying for a play-off spot. They subsequently lost the semi-final versus Chertsey FC.

Ground

The club played at Castlefields from their establishment until 1945, when a site for a new ground was offered to them by Lord Camrose. The new ground was initially known as Winchester Road, and consisted of a small wooden stand together with grass banking with some terracing. The first match was played on 1 December 1945 against Southampton Borough Police, and the ground was later renamed after Lord Camrose.

A new clubhouse was built in 1969 and a new main stand in 1970. Terracing was also added to the ground and floodlights erected. A roof was later installed over the terracing opposite the stand, with another terrace built next to the stand. The ground's record attendance of 5,085 was set in 1997 for an FA Cup first round match against Wycombe Wanderers. It currently has a capacity of 6,000, of which 651 is seated and 2,000 covered.

During the 2014–15 season it was known as the Soccer AM Stadium due to a sponsorship deal with the Sky Sports show, before becoming the Ark Cancer Charity Stadium for the 2016–17 season.

In 2019 the club was forced to relocate to Winchester City's City Ground as former chairman Rafi Razzak attempted to sell the Camrose for development. In October 2020 the club returned to Basingstoke, at the upgraded FA Winklebury Sports Complex in the Winklebury area of the town.

Club staff
First team
Manager: Dan Brownlie
Assistant Manager: Aaron Nicholson
Coach: Paul Worsfold
Coach: Jon Boardman
Physiotherapist: Gideon Vallence & Ellis Mitchell
Goalkeeper Coach: Geraint Holliman & Lance Forster
Head of Player Recruitment: Mark French

Academy
Academy Manager: Aaron Nicholson 
Academy Coach: Kieran Rodgers

Honours
Southern League
Southern Division champions 1984–85
Hampshire League
Division One champions 1967–68, 1968–69, 1970–71
North Division champions 1911–12, 1919–20
Hampshire Senior Cup
Winners 1970–71, 1989–90, 1995–96, 1996–97, 2007–08, 2013–14, 2016–17
Remembrance Cup
Winners 2005, 2006

Records
Best league position: 3rd in the Conference South, 2014–15
Best FA Cup performance: Second round, 1989–90, 1997–98, 2006–07
Best FA Trophy performance: Third round, 1998–99, 2003–04
Most appearances: Billy Coombs (1980s)
Most goals: Paul Coombs 159 (1991–99)
Biggest win: 10–1 vs Chichester City, FA Cup first qualifying round, 1976
Heaviest defeat: 8–0 vs Aylesbury United, Southern League Division One South, April 1979
Record attendance: 5,085 vs Wycombe Wanderers, FA Cup first round, November 1997
Record league attendance: 2,810 vs Aldershot Town, Isthmian League Premier Division 26 December 1998
Record transfer fee paid: £4,750 to Gosport Borough for Steve Ingham

See also
Basingstoke Town F.C. players
Basingstoke Town F.C. managers

References

External links
Club website
Supporters Club website

 
Football clubs in England
Football clubs in Hampshire
Association football clubs established in 1896
1896 establishments in England
Sport in Basingstoke
Hampshire League
Southern Football League clubs
Isthmian League
National League (English football) clubs

el:Μπεϊσινγκστόουκ#Μπεϊσινγκστόουκ Τάουν ΦΚ